"It's the End of the World as We Know It (And I Feel Fine)" is a song by American rock band R.E.M., which first appeared on their 1987 album, Document. It was released as the album's second single in November 1987, reaching No. 69 in the US Billboard Hot 100 and later reaching No. 39 on the UK Singles Chart on its re-release in December 1991.

Lyrics 
The track is known for its quick-flying, seemingly stream of consciousness rant with many diverse references, such as a quartet of individuals with the initials "L.B.": Leonard Bernstein, Leonid Brezhnev, Lenny Bruce, and Lester Bangs. In a 1990s interview with Musician magazine, R.E.M.'s lead singer Michael Stipe claimed that the "L.B." references came from a dream he had in which he found himself at a party surrounded by famous people who all shared those initials. "The words come from everywhere," Stipe explained to Q Magazine in 1992. "I'm extremely aware of everything around me, whether I am in a sleeping state, awake, dream-state or just in day to day life, so that ended up in the song along with a lot of stuff I'd seen when I was flipping TV channels. It's a collection of streams of consciousness."

The song originated from a previously unreleased song called "PSA" ("Public Service Announcement"); the two are very similar in melody and tempo. "PSA" was itself later reworked and released as a single in 2003, under the title "Bad Day". In an interview with Guitar World magazine published in November 1996, R.E.M. guitarist Peter Buck agreed that "End of the World" was in the tradition of Bob Dylan's "Subterranean Homesick Blues".

The song was included on the 2001 Clear Channel memorandum of songs thought to be "lyrically questionable" after the September 11 terrorist attacks.

Reception
Cash Box said that "Overdriven guitars push this blazing rock ode to the modern calamity. A high energy AOR smash with R.E.M.'s unique stamp of disapproval."

Chart performance
In 1992, the song was played repeatedly for a 24-hour period (with brief promos interspersed) to introduce the new format for WENZ 107.9 FM "The End", a radio station in Cleveland, Ohio. When the station underwent a new format change in 1996, they again played the song in 24-hour loop. There was a documentary film made about the station entitled The End of the World As We Knew It, released in 2009, which featured many of the former staffers and jocks.

The song was featured in several satirical videos on YouTube, in connection with the prediction of radio pastor Harold Camping of Family Radio, that the world would end on May 21, 2011. Also, before the supposed Mayan apocalypse on December 21, 2012, sales for the song jumped from 3,000 to 19,000 copies for the week. Alternative radio station CFEX-FM in Calgary, Alberta, Canada, stunted by playing the song all day on December 21, 2012, interspersed with "Get to Know a Mayan" and "Apocalypse Survival Tips" segments.

Amid the global COVID-19 pandemic, the song received an increase in downloads and streaming in March 2020 alongside other apocalypse- and sickness-themed songs. Online downloads of the song rose 184 percent, while streams rose 48 percent.

Music video 
The music video was directed by James Herbert, who worked with the band on several other videos in the late 1980s. It depicts a teenage skateboarder, Noah Ray, in a cluttered room of an abandoned, half-collapsed farmhouse. As he rummages through the junk, including several band pictures and flyers, he shows off various toys and items to the camera and plays with a dog that wanders into the house. As the video ends, he removes his shirt and starts performing skateboard tricks while still inside the room.

Track listing

Initial release 
 "7: IRS IRM 145 (UK):
 "It's the End of the World as We Know It (And I Feel Fine)" – 4:04
 "This One Goes Out" (live acoustic version of "The One I Love") – 4:19

 "7: IRS IRS-53220 (US); cassette: IRS IRSC-53220:
 "It's the End of the World as We Know It (And I Feel Fine)" – 4:04
 "Last Date" (Floyd Cramer cover) – 2:13

 "12: IRS IRMT 145:
 "It's the End of the World as We Know It (And I Feel Fine)" – 4:04
 "This One Goes Out" (live acoustic version of "The One I Love") – 4:19
 "Maps and Legends" (live acoustic)

 "12 Promo: IRS 7363 (US):
 "It's the End of the World as We Know It (And I Feel Fine)" – 4:04
 "Disturbance at the Heron House (Live from cassette 5.24.87 McCabes Guitar Shop)" – 3:41

Re-issue 
 CD: IRS DIRMT 180:
 "It's the End of the World as We Know It (And I Feel Fine)" – 4:04
 "Radio Free Europe" – 4:03
 "The One I Love" (Live Acoustic) – 4:19

 CD: IRS DIRMX 180:
 "It's the End of the World as We Know It (And I Feel Fine)" – 4:04
 "Radio Free Europe" (Hib-Tone version) – 3:46
 "White Tornado" – 1:59
 "Last Date" – 2:13

 "7: IRS IRM 180; cassette: IRS DIRMC 180:
 "It's the End of the World as We Know It (And I Feel Fine)" – 4:04
 "Radio Free Europe" – 4:03

Personnel 
R.E.M.
Bill Berry – drums, backing vocals
Peter Buck – guitar
Mike Mills – bass guitar, piano, backing vocals
Michael Stipe – lead vocals

Charts

Certifications

Cover versions 
Vic Chesnutt, a folk singer discovered by R.E.M.'s Michael Stipe, recorded a very loose cover of the song for the 1992 R.E.M. tribute album Surprise Your Pig.
Newfoundland folk-rockers Great Big Sea covered the song on their 1997 album Play under the title "End of the World". Their version is a minute and a half shorter than R.E.M.'s, yet still contains all the verses (the faster time is achieved primarily by their increasing the tempo). It peaked at #24 on the Canadian Singles Chart on the week of April 6, 1998.
DC Talk covered a 7 minute and 18 second version of the song with a rap medley bridge and band introduction on their 1997 live album, Welcome to the Freak Show.
The Suicide Machines covered the song for their 2001 release Steal This Record.
American actress America Ferrera covered the song during episode "Blackout!" of ABC television series Ugly Betty.
On May 21, 2011, in preparation for the apparent 2011 end times prediction, the song was covered by Matt Nathanson, Sugarland, and Little Big Town in Holmdel, New Jersey, and Bon Jovi did a separate cover in Milwaukee, Wisconsin.
Orange County ska punk band Starpool released a cover of the song as a digital download on December 21, 2012.
In 2011, Chris Carrabba of Dashboard Confessional covered this song on his album Covered In The Flood.
 Peter Buffett covered the song and released it on December 21, 2012.
 Italian rocker and songwriter Luciano Ligabue covered the song and released it on his fourth album  (1994)
 American duo Pomplamoose, alongside British artist dodie and Maddie Poppe, covered the song and released it during the COVID-19 pandemic (2020). It was recorded in their homes, as a result of the social distancing measures imposed around the world.

References 

1987 singles
1988 singles
1991 singles
1998 singles
List songs
R.E.M. songs
Songs written by Bill Berry
Songs written by Michael Stipe
Songs written by Mike Mills
Songs written by Peter Buck
I.R.S. Records singles
Song recordings produced by Scott Litt
Song recordings produced by Michael Stipe
Song recordings produced by Mike Mills
Song recordings produced by Bill Berry
Song recordings produced by Peter Buck
Great Big Sea songs
Patter songs
1987 songs
Post-punk songs
Folk rock songs